is an extreme trans-Neptunian object from the scattered disc, located in the outermost regions of the Solar System, approximately  in diameter. It was discovered on 2 August 2013, by astronomers of the Outer Solar System Origins Survey at Mauna Kea Observatory, Hawaii, United States.

Orbit 

With a semi-major axis of 196 AU,  orbits the Sun at a distance of 43.9–348 AU once every 2,742 years. Its orbit has an eccentricity of 0.78 and an inclination of 11° with respect to the ecliptic. 

 belongs to a small number of detached objects with perihelion distances of 30 AU or more, and semi-major axes of 150 AU or more. Such objects can not reach such orbits without some perturbing object, which lead to the speculation of planet nine.

Physical characteristics

Spectral type 

The object is estimated to have a bluish spectra (BB).

Diameter 

 has been estimated to measure 243 and 340 kilometers in diameter, based on an assumed albedo of 0.09 and 0.04, respectively. A generic magnitude-to-diameter conversion gives a mean-diameter of 260 kilometers, using with a typical albedo of 0.08 and a published absolute magnitude of 6.2951.

Numbering and naming 

 was numbered (505478) by the Minor Planet Center on 4 November 2017. As of 2017, this minor planet has not received a name.

References

External links 
 MPEC 2017-M21 : 2013 UT15
 Asteroid Lightcurve Database (LCDB), query form (info )
 Dictionary of Minor Planet Names, Google books
 Asteroids and comets rotation curves, CdR – Observatoire de Genève, Raoul Behrend
 Discovery Circumstances: Numbered Minor Planets (505001)-(510000) – Minor Planet Center
 
 

505478
505478
505478
20130802